Kamaljeet (born Shashi Rekhi) was an Indian actor in Hindi language films.

Personal life
Rekhi married Indian actress Waheeda Rehman in 1974. The couple have a daughter and son – Kashvi and Sohail.

Professional life 
His major work includes Son of India and Shagoon (co-starring Waheeda Rehman).

Filmography
 1992 Heer Ranjha
 1988 Tamacha
 1970 Veer Ghatotkach
 1964 Qawwali Ki Raat
 1964 Shagoon
 1964 Vidyapati
 1962 Sher Khan
 1962 Son of India
 1961 Mr. India
 1957 Kitna Badal Gaya Insaan
 1957 Zamana
 1956 Kismet Ka Khel
 1956 Mr. Lambu

References

External links
 

Male actors in Hindi cinema
20th-century Indian male actors